The Hotel Franklin, at 217 West Jefferson in Mangum, Oklahoma, was built in 1929.  It was listed on the National Register of Historic Places in 2007.

It is a five-story, red brick building located at the northwest comer of Mangum's town square, specifically at the northwest corner of West Jefferson Street and West Commerce
Alley.

It has a three-part form of some skyscrapers, with base, shaft and capital. It has a reinforced concrete frame, with hollow clay tile curtain walls, sheathed in break. Carthage stone is used for trim. The hotel is topped by a neon "Hotel Franklin" sign.

References

Hotels in Oklahoma
National Register of Historic Places in Greer County, Oklahoma

Late 19th and Early 20th Century American Movements architecture
Buildings and structures completed in 1929